Spike-timing-dependent plasticity (STDP) is a biological process that adjusts the strength of connections between neurons in the brain. The process adjusts the connection strengths based on the relative timing of a particular neuron's output and input action potentials (or spikes). The STDP process partially explains the activity-dependent development of nervous systems, especially with regard to long-term potentiation and long-term depression.

Process 

Under the STDP process, if an input spike to a neuron tends, on average, to occur immediately before that neuron's output spike, then that particular input is made somewhat stronger. If an input spike tends, on average, to occur immediately after an output spike, then that particular input is made somewhat weaker hence: "spike-timing-dependent plasticity". Thus, inputs that might be the cause of the post-synaptic neuron's excitation are made even more likely to contribute in the future, whereas inputs that are not the cause of the post-synaptic spike are made less likely to contribute in the future. The process continues until a subset of the initial set of connections remain, while the influence of all others is reduced to 0. Since a neuron produces an output spike when many of its inputs occur within a brief period, the subset of inputs that remain are those that tended to be correlated in time. In addition, since the inputs that occur before the output are strengthened, the inputs that provide the earliest indication of correlation will eventually become the final input to the neuron.

History 
In 1973, M. M. Taylor suggested that if synapses were strengthened for which a presynaptic spike occurred just before a postsynaptic spike more often than the reverse (Hebbian learning), while with the opposite timing or in the absence of a closely timed presynaptic spike, synapses were weakened (anti-Hebbian learning), the result would be an informationally efficient recoding of input patterns. This proposal apparently passed unnoticed in the neuroscientific community, and subsequent experimentation was conceived independently of these early suggestions.

Early experiments on associative plasticity were carried out by W. B. Levy and O. Steward in 1983 and examined the effect of relative timing of pre- and postsynaptic action potentials at millisecond level on plasticity. Bruce McNaughton contributed much to this area, too.
In studies on neuromuscular synapses carried out by Y. Dan and Mu-ming Poo in 1992, and on the hippocampus by D. Debanne, B. Gähwiler, and S. Thompson in 1994, showed that asynchronous pairing of postsynaptic and synaptic activity induced long-term synaptic depression. However, STDP was more definitively demonstrated by Henry Markram in his postdoc period till 1993 in Bert Sakmann's lab (SFN and Phys Soc abstracts in 1994–1995) which was only published in 1997. C. Bell and co-workers also found a form of STDP in the cerebellum. Henry Markram used dual patch clamping techniques to repetitively activate pre-synaptic neurons 10 milliseconds before activating the post-synaptic target neurons, and found the strength of the synapse increased. When the activation order was reversed so that the pre-synaptic neuron was activated 10 milliseconds after its post-synaptic target neuron, the strength of the pre-to-post synaptic connection decreased. Further work, by Guoqiang Bi, Li Zhang, and Huizhong Tao in Mu-Ming Poo's lab in 1998, continued the mapping of the entire time course relating pre- and post-synaptic activity and synaptic change, to show that in their preparation synapses that are activated within 5-20 ms before a postsynaptic spike are strengthened, and those that are activated within a similar time window after the spike are weakened. This phenomenon has been observed in various other preparations, with some variation in the time-window relevant for plasticity. Several reasons for timing-dependent plasticity have been suggested. For example, STDP might provide a substrate for Hebbian learning during development, or, as suggested by Taylor in 1973, the associated Hebbian and anti-Hebbian learning rules might create informationally efficient coding in bundles of related neurons. Works from Y. Dan's lab advanced to study STDP in in vivo systems.

Mechanisms 

Postsynaptic NMDA receptors are highly sensitive to the membrane potential (see coincidence detection in neurobiology). Due to their high permeability for calcium, they generate a local chemical signal that is largest when the back-propagating action potential in the dendrite arrives shortly after the synapse was active (pre-post spiking). Large postsynaptic calcium transients are known to trigger synaptic potentiation (Long-term potentiation). The mechanism for spike-timing-dependent depression is less well understood, but often involves either postsynaptic voltage-dependent calcium entry/mGluR activation, or retrograde endocannabinoids and presynaptic NMDARs.

From Hebbian rule to STDP 

According to the Hebbian rule, synapses increase their efficiency if the synapse persistently takes part in firing the postsynaptic target neuron. Similarly, the efficiency of synapses decreases when the firing of their presynaptic targets is persistently independent of firing their postsynaptic ones. These principles are often simplified in the mnemonics: those who fire together, wire together; and those who fire out of sync, lose their link. However, if two neurons fire exactly at the same time, then one cannot have caused, or taken part in firing the other. Instead, to take part in firing the postsynaptic neuron, the presynaptic neuron needs to fire just before the postsynaptic neuron. Experiments that stimulated two connected neurons with varying interstimulus asynchrony confirmed the importance of temporal relation implicit in Hebb's principle: for the synapse to be potentiated or depressed, the presynaptic neuron has to fire just before or just after the postsynaptic neuron, respectively. In addition, it has become evident that the presynaptic neural firing needs to consistently predict the postsynaptic firing for synaptic plasticity to occur robustly, mirroring at a synaptic level what is known about the importance of contingency in classical conditioning, where zero contingency procedures prevent the association between two stimuli.

Role in hippocampal learning 

For the most efficient STDP, the presynaptic and postsynaptic signal has to be separated by approximately a dozen milliseconds. However, events happening within a couple of minutes can typically be linked together by the hippocampus as episodic memories. To resolve this contradiction, a mechanism relying on the theta waves and the phase precession has been proposed: Representations of different memory entities (such as a place, face, person etc.) are repeated on each theta cycle at a given theta phase during the episode to be remembered. Expected, ongoing, and completed entities have early, intermediate and late theta phases, respectively. In the CA3 region of the hippocampus, the recurrent network turns entities with neighboring theta phases into coincident ones thereby allowing STDP to link them together. Experimentally detectable memory sequences are created this way by reinforcing the connection between subsequent (neighboring) representations.

Uses in artificial neural networks 
The concept of STDP has been shown to be a proven learning algorithm for forward-connected artificial neural networks in pattern recognition. Recognising traffic, sound or movement using Dynamic Vision Sensor (DVS) cameras has been an area of research. Correct classifications with a high degree of accuracy with only minimal learning time has been shown. It was shown that a spiking neuron trained with STDP learns a linear model of a dynamic system with minimal least square error.

A general approach, replicated from the core biological principles, is to apply a window function (Δw) to each synapse in a network. The window function will increase the weight (and therefore the connection) of a synapse when the parent neuron fires just before the child neuron, but will decrease otherwise.

Several variations of the window function have been proposed to allow for a range of learning speeds and classification accuracy.

See also 

 Synaptic plasticity
 Didactic organisation

References

Further reading

External links 
 Spike-timing dependent plasticity - Scholarpedia

Neuroplasticity
Memory